is a Japanese light novel series written by Gen Urobuchi and illustrated by Higashiguchi Chūō. The series was published in two volumes under Shogakukan's Gagaga Bunko light novel imprint from July to December 2009. The series was also adapted into a manga series illustrated by Anno Nanakamado, which was serialized from May 2016 to September 2018. An anime film adaptation produced by A-1 Pictures has been announced.

Media

Light novel

Manga
A manga adaptation illustrated by Anno Nanakamado began serialization in Shogakukan's Hibana magazine on May 7, 2016. On September 24, 2017, after the magazine ceased publication on August 7, 2017, the series was moved to Shogakukan's MangaONE app, where it continued until September 23, 2018. It was collected in four tankōbon volumes, released between September 23, 2016 and November 12, 2018.

Anime film
On September 24, 2022, during the Aniplex Online Fest 2022 event, an anime film adaptation produced by A-1 Pictures was announced. The film is directed by Daizen Komatsuda, with Seiji Mizushima serving as chief director, Yukie Sugawara writing the screenplay along with Mizushima, Keigo Sasaki adapting Takashi Takeuchi's original character designs for animation, Kanetaki Ebikawa, Takayuki Yanase, and Fumihiro Katagai serving as mechanical designers, Tatsuya Yoshikawa serving as dragon designer, and Yuki Kajiura composing the music.

References

External links
  
 

2009 Japanese novels
A-1 Pictures
Anime and manga based on light novels
Anime films composed by Yuki Kajiura
Aniplex
Gagaga Bunko
Nitroplus
Seinen manga
Shogakukan manga